The 1970 season was the 65th season of competitive football in Norway.

Men's football

League season

Promotion and relegation

1. divisjon

2. divisjon

Group A

Group B

District IX–X

District XI

3. divisjon

Norwegian Cup

Final

UEFA competitions

European Cup

First round

|}

European Cup Winners' Cup

First round

|}

Non-UEFA competitions

Inter-Cities Fairs Cup

First round

|}

National team

References

 
Seasons in Norwegian football